Katrina Matthews (born 13 March 1991) is an English professional triathlete who races primarily in non-drafting, long-distance events. Her career includes a second place finish at the 2021 Ironman World Championship and fourth place the 2021 Ironman 70.3 World Championship. She was a member of the BMC Pro triathlon team 2020-2022 and is also a physiotherapist working for the British Army.

Triathlon career 
In 2018, as an amateur, Matthews won Ironman 70.3 Calgary as well as the UK National Championships later on in the year. The next year, Matthews won Challenge Gran Canaria as an amateur securing her pro license. She would then go on to podium at four middle distance events as well as finishing 16th position at the 2018 Ironman 70.3 World Championship in Nice. This was also the year of her first Ironman, IM Western Australia. She came 4th and debuted with a time of 8:53:58.

In 2020 Matthews won Ironman Florida with a time of 8:40:50 - the 3rd fastest ever British woman. She won the Outlaw X and won IM 70.3 Tallinn qualifying for the IM 70.3 world champs in 2021. Notably she also won the UK national 100 mile cycling TT in 3 hours and 55 minutes.

In 2021, Matthews finished fourth at the IM 70.3 World Championship in St George. In the inaugural PTO Collins Cup she had the 4th fastest time, winning her match. She also won IM UK in Bolton and came 2nd to Daniela Ryf at IM Tulsa.

In 2022, Matthews won Ironman Lanzarote 70.3 beating the reigning Ironman world champion Anne Haug by over 3 minutes. She was then invited to participate in the Sub7Sub8 challenge racing against Nicola Spirig, replacing Lucy Charles-Barclay. Matthews achieved the sub-8 hour goal finishing ahead of Spirig with a time of 7:31:57, the fastest ever Ironman distance time. Matthews was named British Army Sportswoman of the Year 2022.

Notable results
Some of Matthews' notable achievements include:

References

External links

PTO athlete profile

1991 births
Living people
English female triathletes
People from Exmouth
Sportspeople from Devon
21st-century British Army personnel